Los cuatro finalistas is a singing contest program of Peruvian television based on the American program The Four: Battle For Stardom, premiered on April 14 and is broadcast on Saturdays and Sundays, at 10 pm. and 7 pm. respectively. The winner will have the opportunity to sign a contract with Universal Music. The program is conducted by Cristian Rivero. It is broadcast by Latina.

The jury is composed of Eva Ayllón, Deyvis Orosco, Chyno Miranda and Pedro Suárez-Vértiz, who gives his opinion virtually.

Format 
The program consists in that the contestants, known as the challengers, sing live in front of the audience and the judges, who will choose if the challenger will face one of the finalists or not, the vote of the four judges must be unanimous (With only negative feedback it is enough for the challenger to be eliminated) so that the challenger has the opportunity to face the finalist he chooses (Except if only one finalist remains to challenge).

If the challenger is chosen by the judges, the challenger will move on to the next round, which consists of a singing contest between the challenger and the finalist chosen by him. At the end of the singing contest, the audience will be responsible for choosing, by means of a vote of approximately 90 seconds through the Latina app, who remains as a finalist. In either case, if the challenger stays or is eliminated, the finalist's seat is blocked, so the finalist can not be challenged again until the next program.

Series overview

Season synopses

Season 1 
The first season of Los cuatro finalistas premiered on April 14, 2018 and concluded on June 10, 2018. The winner of this season was Javier Arias, with José Gaona as runner-up. Giani Méndez and Susan Ochoa were also in the final group of the finalists.

Season 2 
The second season of Los cuatro finalistas premiered on June 16, 2018.

Season 3: La Batalla Final 
The third season of Los cuatro finalistas premiered on November 15, 2018.

See also 

 The Four: Battle For Stardom — USA version of the Israeli format called The Final Four.

References

External links
 

2010s Peruvian television series
2018 Peruvian television series debuts
Latina Televisión original programming